Garrettson-Baine-Bartholomew House is a historic home located at Michigan City, LaPorte County, Indiana.  It was built in 1908, and is a two-story, asymmetrical, Tudor Revival style dwelling.  It features a full-length porch, stone first story, and stucco and half-timbering on the second story.

It was listed on the National Register of Historic Places in 2001.

References

Houses on the National Register of Historic Places in Indiana
Tudor Revival architecture in Indiana
Houses completed in 1909
Houses in LaPorte County, Indiana
National Register of Historic Places in LaPorte County, Indiana